YTM means yield to maturity.

YTM may also refer to:

 YTM, the United States Navy hull classification symbol for "medium harbor tug"
 YTM, the International Air Transport Association airport code for Rivière Rouge – Mont Tremblant International Airport, Canada
 YTM, YouTube Music